The 2019 TCU Horned Frogs baseball team represents Texas Christian University during the 2019 NCAA Division I baseball season. The Horned Frogs play their home games at Charlie & Marie Lupton Baseball Stadium as a member of the Big 12 Conference. They are led by head coach Jim Schlossnagle, the winningest coach in TCU baseball history, in his 16th year at TCU.

Previous season
On the heels of four consecutive trips to the College World Series, the 2018 TCU Horned Frogs baseball team entered the season with high expectations, ranking as high as No. 4 in the preseason polls. However, the team did not live up to the lofty expectations, posting a record of 33–23, including a disappointing 10–13 in conference play. Nevertheless, the Horned Frogs, entering the Big 12 Tournament as the six seed, fought to the final where they fell 5–6 to the Baylor Bears in 11-innings. Despite their impressive Big 12 Tournament showing, TCU failed to make the 2018 NCAA Division I baseball tournament.

Preseason

MLB draft 
The following Horned Frogs on the 2018 roster were selected in the 2018 Major League Baseball draft:

* indicates draftee had no more college eligibility

Departed Players
The following Horned Frogs on the 2017 roster departed the program prior to the 2018 season:

Schedule and results

! style="background:#4d1979;color:white;"| Regular Season
|- valign="top" 

|- align="center" bgcolor="ffbbbb"
| February 15 || 3:00 pm || || No. 18 * || No. 19 || Salt River Fields at Talking Stick • Scottsdale, AZ • MLB4 Tournament || L0–2 || Bibee{1–0) || Lodolo(0–1) || Weisberg(1) || || 0–1 || – || StatsStory
|- align="center" bgcolor="bbffbb"
| February 16 || 7:00 pm ||  || Virginia* || No. 19 || Salt River Fields at Talking Stick • Scottsdale, AZ • MLB4 Tournament || W9–4 || Mihlbauer(1–0) || Vasil(0–1) || – || 2,176 || 1–1 || – || StatsStory
|- align="center" bgcolor="bbffbb"
| February 17 || 1:00 pm ||  || No. 2 Vanderbilt* || No. 19 || Salt River Fields at Talking Stick • Scottsdale, AZ • MLB4 Tournament || W10–2 || Eissler(1–0) || Rocker(0–1) || – || || 2–1 || – || StatsStory
|- align="center" bgcolor="bbffbb"
| February 20 || 6:30 pm ||  || * || No. 16 || Lupton Stadium • Fort Worth, TX || W12–4 || Arrighetti(1–0) || Brager(0–1) || – || 3,915 || 3–1 || – || StatsStory
|- align="center" bgcolor="ffbbbb"
| February 22 || 6:30 pm ||  || * || No. 16 || Lupton Stadium • Fort Worth, TX || L1–4 || Mechals(2–0) || Lodolo(0–2) || Ohanian(1) || 3,592 || 3–2 || – || StatsStory
|- align="center" bgcolor="bbffbb"
| February 23 || 3:00 pm ||  || Grand Canyon* || No. 16 || Lupton Stadium • Fort Worth, TX || W17–9 || Eissler(2–0) || Ohl(1–1) || – || 4,221 || 4–2 || – || StatsStory
|- align="center" bgcolor="bbffbb"
| February 24 || 1:00 pm ||  || Grand Canyon* || No. 16 || Lupton Stadium • Fort Worth, TX || W6–5 || Williamson(1–0) || Scalzo(0–2) || Perez(1) || 3,765 || 5–2 || – || StatsStory
|-

|- align="center" bgcolor="bbffbb"
| March 1 || 3:00 pm || AT&TSN || * || No. 19 || Minute Maid Park • Houston, TX • Shriners College Classic || W10–6 || Lodolo(1–2) || Bielamowicz(0–1) || King(1) || || 6–2 || – || StatsStory
|- align="center" bgcolor="ffbbbb"
| March 2 || 7:00 pm || AT&TSN || No. 23 Texas A&M* || No. 19 || Minute Maid Park • Houston, TX • Shriners College Classic || L0–1 || Lacy(3–0) || Williamson(2–1) || Kalich(4) ||  || 6–3 || – || StatsStory
|- align="center" bgcolor="ffbbbb"
| March 3 || 7:00 pm || AT&TSN || * || No. 19 || Minute Maid Park • Houston, TX • Shriners College Classic || L2–12 || Parthasarthy(2–1) || Janczak(0–1) || – ||  || 6–4 || – || StatsStory
|- align="center" bgcolor="bbffbb"
| March 5 || 3:00 pm || HFTV || * || || Lupton Stadium • Fort Worth, TX || W19–3 || Green(1–0) || Mangus(0–1) || – || 3,490 || 7–4 || – || StatsStory
|- align="center" bgcolor="bbffbb"
| March 8 || 8:00 pm || || * || || Blair Field • Long Beach, CA || W4–1 || Lodolo(2–2) || Baayoun(0–3) || Perez(2) || 1,359 || 8–4 || – || StatsStory
|- align="center" bgcolor="ffbbbb"
| March 9 || 8:00 pm || || Long Beach State* || || Blair Field • Long Beach, CA || L3–14 || Seminaris(1–2) || Eissler(2–1) || – || 1,475 || 8–5 || – || StatsStory
|- align="center" bgcolor="bbffbb"
| March 10 || 3:00 pm || || Long Beach State* || || Blair Field • Long Beach, CA || W10–4 || King(1–0) || Pacheco(1–2) || – || 1,893 || 9–5 || – || StatsStory
|- align="center" bgcolor="ffbbbb"
| March 12 || 8:00 pm || || * || || Fowler Park • San Diego, CA || L6–9 || Miller(2–1) || Mihlbauer(1–1) || Dolak(2) || 550 || 9–6 || – || StatsStory
|- align="center" bgcolor="bbffbb"
| March 15 || 6:30 pm || HFTV || * || || Lupton Stadium • Fort Worth, TX || W12–2 || Lodolo(3–2) || Granzotto(1–3) || – || 3,686 || 10–6 || – || StatsStory
|- align="center" bgcolor="bbffbb"
| March 16 || 5:00 pm || HFTV || Eastern Michigan* || || Lupton Stadium • Fort Worth, TX ||W16–4 || Eissler(3–1) || Porretto(0–2) || – || 3,597 || 11–6 || – || StatsStory
|- align="center" bgcolor="bbffbb"
| March 17 || 1:00 pm || HFTV || Eastern Michigan* || || Lupton Stadium • Fort Worth, TX ||W12–1 || Williamson(2–1) || Meis(0–4) || – || 4,187 || 12–6 || – || StatsStory
|- align="center" bgcolor="bbffbb"
| March 19 || 7:00 pm || || UT Arlington* || || Globe Life Park in Arlington • Arlington, TX || W5–3 || Green(2–0) || Gomez(0–1) || Perez(3) || 1,696 || 13–6 || – || StatsStory
|- align="center" bgcolor="bbffbb"
| March 22 || 6:30 pm || FSSW+ || No. 17 Texas || || Lupton Stadium • Fort Worth, TX || W3–2 || Perez(1–0) || Fields(1–1) || – || 5,590 || 14–6 || 1–0 || StatsStory
|- align="center" bgcolor="ffbbbb"
| March 23 || 7:30 pm || ESPNU || No. 17 Texas || || Lupton Stadium • Fort Worth, TX || L1–13 || Henley(3–1) || Eissler(3–2) || – || 5,211 || 14–7 || 1–1 || StatsStory
|- align="center" bgcolor="bbffbb"
| March 24 || 1:00 pm || FSSW+ || No. 17 Texas || || Lupton Stadium • Fort Worth, TX || W12–8 || Perez(2–0) || Quintanilla(1–1) || – || 4,498 || 15–7 || 2–1 || StatsStory
|- align="center" bgcolor="bbffbb"
| March 26 || 5:00 pm || FSSW+ || * || No. 28 || Lupton Stadium • Fort Worth, TX || W6–2 || Arrighetti(2–0) || Hollas(0–3) || – || 3,442 || 16–7 || 2–1 || StatsStory
|- align="center" bgcolor="bbffbb"
| March 29 || 6:30 pm || FSSW ||  || No. 28 || Lupton Stadium • Fort Worth, TX || W7–4 || Lodolo(4–2) || Elliott(3–1) || Perez(4) || 4,299 || 17–7 || 3–1 || StatsStory
|- align="center" bgcolor="ffbbbb"
| March 30 || 2:00 pm || FSSW || Oklahoma State || No. 28 || Lupton Stadium • Fort Worth, TX || L6–7 || Leeper(3–0) || Perez(2–1) || – || 4,448 || 17–8 || 3–2 || StatsStory
|- align="center" bgcolor="ffbbbb"
| March 31 || 2:00 pm || HFTV || Oklahoma State || No. 28 || Lupton Stadium • Fort Worth, TX || L8–9 || Lyons(2–2) || King(1–1) || Leeper(4) || 4,308 || 17–9 || 3–3 || StatsStory
|-

|- align="center" bgcolor="bbffbb"
| April 2 || 6:30 pm || HFTV || UT Arlington* || No. 25 || Lupton Stadium • Fort Worth, TX || W3–2 || Coughlin(1–0) || Gross(0–1) || – || 3,820 || 18–9 || 3–3 || StatsStory
|- align="center" bgcolor="ffbbbb"
| April 5 || 6:00 pm || FSSW ||  || No. 25 || Mitchell Park • Norman, OK || L6–7 || Ruffcorn(1–1) || Eissler(3–3) || – || 1,389 || 18–10 || 3–4 || StatsStory
|- align="center" bgcolor="bbffbb"
| April 6 || 5:00 pm || || Oklahoma || No. 25 || Mitchell Park • Norman, OK || W4–2 || King(2–1) || Olds(0–2) || Perez(5) || 1,662 || 19–10 || 4–4 || StatsStory
|- align="center" bgcolor="bbffbb"
| April 7 || 1:00 pm || || Oklahoma || No. 25 || Mitchell Park • Norman, OK || W6–4 || Williamson(3–1) || Prater(5–3) || Notary(1) || 1,012 || 20–10 || 5–4 || StatsStory
|- align="center" bgcolor="ffbbbb"
| April 9 || 3:00 pm || || Dallas Baptist* || No. 22 || Horner Ballpark • Dallas, TX || L6–11 || Reeves(1–0) || Green(2–1) || – || 1,542 || 20–11 || 5–4 || StatsStory
|- align="center" bgcolor="bbffbb"
| April 12 || 3:00 pm || || * || No. 22 || Lupton Stadium • Fort Worth, TX || W5–1 || Lodolo(5–2) || DeVito(1–3) || – || 3,695 || 21–11 || 5–4 || StatsStory
|- align="center" bgcolor="bbffbb"
| April 12 || 6:30 pm || HFTV || Seton Hall* || No. 22 || Lupton Stadium • Fort Worth, TX || W8–6 || Perez(3–1) || Patten(1–3) || – || 3,952 || 22–11 || 5–4 || StatsStory
|- align="center" bgcolor="ffbbbb"
| April 14 || 1:00 pm || HFTV || Seton Hall* || No. 22 || Lupton Stadium • Fort Worth, TX || L3–7 || Thompson(3–1) || Williamson(3–2) || – || 3,919 || 22–12 || 5–4 || StatsStory
|- align="center" bgcolor="ffbbbb"
| April 16 || 6:40 pm || || No. 29 UT Arlington* || No. 20 || Clay Gould Ballpark • Arlington, TX || L3–6 || Anderson(6–3) || Janczak(0–2) || Gross (15) || 730 || 22–13 || 5–4 || StatsStory
|- align="center" bgcolor="ffbbbb"
| April 18 || 6:00 pm || ESPN3 ||  || No. 20 || Tointon Family Stadium • Manhattan, KS || L4–7 || Hassall(2–1) || Lodolo(5–3) || – || 1,285 || 22–14 || 5–5 || StatsStory
|- align="center" bgcolor="bbffbb"
| April 19 || 6:00 pm || ESPN3 || Kansas State || No. 20 || Tointon Family Stadium • Manhattan, KS || W8–1 || King(3–1) || Ford(0–4) || – || 1,683 || 23–14 || 6–5 || StatsStory
|- align="center" bgcolor="ffbbbb"
| April 20 || 4:00 pm || ESPN3 || Kansas State || No. 20 || Tointon Family Stadium • Manhattan, KS || L10–11 || Brennan(3–4) || Mihlbauer(1–2) || – || 1,901 || 23–15 || 6–6 || StatsStory
|- align="center" bgcolor="ffbbbb"
| April 23 || 3:00 pm || HFTV || Dallas Baptist* || || Lupton Stadium • Fort Worth, TX || L3–9 || Stone(1–0) || Eissler(3–4) || – || 3,936 || 23–16 || 6–6 || StatsStory
|- align="center" bgcolor="ffbbbb"
| April 26 || 6:30 pm || HFTV || No. 23  || || Lupton Stadium • Fort Worth, TX || L3–6 || Leckich(3–0) || Lodolo(5–4) || Hill(6) || 4,816 || 23–17 || 6–7 || StatsStory
|- align="center" bgcolor="ffbbbb"
| April 27 || 3:00 pm || FSSW || No. 23 Baylor || || Lupton Stadium • Fort Worth, TX || L2–15 || Winston(4–1) || King(3–2) || – || 5,556 || 23–18 || 6–8 || StatsStory
|- align="center" bgcolor="ffbbbb"
| April 28 || 1:00 pm || HFTV || No. 23 Baylor || || Lupton Stadium • Fort Worth, TX || L1–12 || Ashkinos(2–2) || Williamson(3–3) || – || 5,576 || 23–19 || 6–9 || StatsStory
|- align="center" bgcolor="bbffbb"
| April 30 || 6:30 pm || || Abilene Christian* || || Crutcher Scott Field • Abilene, TX || W11–6 || Green(3–1) || Jordan(1–1) || – || 1,040 || 24–19 || 6–9 || StatsStory
|-

|- align="center" bgcolor="bbffbb"
| May 3 || 5:30 pm || || No. 28  || || Monongalia County Ballpark • Morgantown, WV || W14–5 || Lodolo(6–4) || Manoah(6–3) || – || 2,043 || 25–19 || 7–9 || StatsStory
|- align="center" bgcolor="bbffbb"
| May 4 || 11:00 am || AT&TSN || No. 28 West Virginia || || Monongalia County Ballpark • Morgantown, WV || W6–1 || King(4–2) || Wolf(2–3) || – || 2,263 || 26–19 || 8–9 || StatsStory
|- align="center" bgcolor="ffbbbb"
| May 5 || 12:00 pm || || No. 28 West Virginia || || Monongalia County Ballpark • Morgantown, WV || L5–6 || Reid(2–0) || Perez(3–2) || – || 1,593 || 26–20 || 8–10 || StatsStory
|- align="center" bgcolor="bbffbb"
| May 10 || 6:30 pm || HFTV ||  || || Lupton Stadium • Fort Worth, TX || W4–3 || Green(4–1) || Goldsberry(5–6) || – || 5,147 || 27–20 || 9–10 || StatsStory
|- align="center" bgcolor="bbffbb"
| May 11 || 4:00 pm || FSSW+ || Kansas || || Lupton Stadium • Fort Worth, TX || W7–4 || Coughlin(2–0) || Ulane(0–1) || – || 4,959 || 28–20 || 10–10 || Stats
|- align="center" bgcolor="ffbbbb"
| May 12 || 1:00 pm || FSSW+ || Kansas || || Lupton Stadium • Fort Worth, TX || L1–3 || Barry(5–0) || Williamson(3–4) || – || 5,050 || 28–21 || 10–11 || StatsStory
|- align="center" bgcolor="ffbbbb"
| May 14 || 6:30 pm || HFTV || * || || Lupton Stadium • Fort Worth, TX || L5–10 || Erickson(2–4) || Janczak(0–3) || – || 5,546 || 28–22 || 10–11 || StatsStory
|- align="center" bgcolor="bbffbb"
| May 16 || 6:30 pm || FSSW || No. 15 Texas Tech || || Dan Law Field at Rip Griffin Park • Lubbock, TX || W3–1 || Brown(1–0) || McMillon(2–3) || Mihlbauer(1) || 4,011 || 29–22 || 11–11 || StatsStory
|- align="center" bgcolor="ffbbbb"
| May 17 || 6:30 pm || FSSW+ || No. 15 Texas Tech || || Dan Law Field at Rip Griffin Park • Lubbock, TX || L2–7 || Kilian(8–2) || King(4–3) || – || 3,954 || 29–23 || 11–12 || StatsStory
|- align="center" bgcolor="ffbbbb"
| May 18 || 6:30 pm || ESPNU || No. 15 Texas Tech || || Dan Law Field at Rip Griffin Park • Lubbock, TX || L4–8 || Bonnin(5–1) || Williamson(3–5) || – || 4,432 || 29–24 || 11–13 || StatsStory
|-

|-
! style="background:#4d1979;color:white;"| Postseason
|-
|- valign="top" 

|- align="center" bgcolor="ffbbbb"
| May 22 || 7:30 pm || FCS || (3) Oklahoma State || (6) || Chickasaw Bricktown Ballpark • Oklahoma City, OK || L2–5 || Scott(3–1) || Lodolo(6–5) || – || 4,242 || 29–25 || 0–1 || Stats
|- align="center" bgcolor="bbffbb"
| May 23 || 12:30 pm || FSSW+ || (7) Oklahoma || (6) || Chickasaw Bricktown Ballpark • Oklahoma City, OK || W15–3 || King(5–3) || Wiles(8–4) || – || 3,280 || 30–25 || 1–1 || StatsStory
|- align="center" bgcolor="bbffbb"
| May 25 || 9:00 am || FSSW+ || (2) Baylor || (6) || Chickasaw Bricktown Ballpark • Oklahoma City, OK || W5–2 || Williamson(4–5) || Ashkinos(2–4) || Coughlin(1) || 6,398 || 31–25 || 2–1 || StatsStory
|- align="center" bgcolor="bbffbb"
| May 25 || 2:00 pm || FSSW || (3) Oklahoma State || (6) || Chickasaw Bricktown Ballpark • Oklahoma City, OK || W13–6 || Green(5–1) || Leeper(3–3) || – || 7,383 || 32–25 || 3–1 || StatsStory
|- align="center" bgcolor="ffbbbb"
| May 26 || 9:00 am || FSSW || (3) Oklahoma State || (6) || Chickasaw Bricktown Ballpark • Oklahoma City, OK || L6–7 || Battenfield(4–3) || Coughlin(2–1) || – || 4,105 || 32–26 || 3–2 || Stats
|-

|- align="center" bgcolor="bbffbb"
| May 31 || 6:00 pm || ESPN3 || (2)  || (3) || Baum-Walker Stadium • Fayetteville, AR || W13–2 || King(6–3) || Horn(6–2) || – || 9,594 || 33–26 || 1–0 || StatsStory
|- align="center" bgcolor="ffbbbb"
| June 1 || 6:00 pm || ESPN3 || No. 5 Arkansas || (3) || Baum-Walker Stadium • Fayetteville, AR || L1–3 || Campbell(11–1) || Lodolo(6–6) || Cronin (12) || 10,967 || 33–27 || 1–1 || StatsStory
|- align="center" bgcolor="bbffbb"
| June 2 || 2:00 pm || ESPN3 || (4)  || (3) || Baum-Walker Stadium • Fayetteville, AR || W9–5 || Eissler(4–4) || Appel(6–1) || – || 9,546 || 34–27 || 2–1 || StatsStory
|- align="center" bgcolor="ffbbbb"
| June 2 || 8:30 pm || ESPNU || No. 5 Arkansas || (3) || Baum-Walker Stadium • Fayetteville, AR || L0–6 || Wicklander(6–3) || Janczak(0–4) || – || 10,242 || 34–28 || 2–2 || StatsStory
|-

| style="font-size:88%" | Legend:       = Win       = Loss      Bold = TCU team member
|-
| style="font-size:88%" | "#" represents ranking. All rankings from Collegiate Baseball on the date of the contest."()" represents postseason seeding in the Big 12 Tournament or NCAA Regional, respectively.

Rankings

2019 MLB draft

TCU had nine players selected in the draft, a program record.

See also
2019 Big 12 Conference baseball tournament
2019 NCAA Division I baseball season

References

TCU Horned Frogs
TCU Horned Frogs baseball seasons
TCU Horned Frogs baseball
TCU